Nicolae Adrian Grigore (born 19 July 1983) is a Romanian former footballer who played as a defensive midfielder for clubs such as: Rapid București, FC Brașov, Al-Ettifaq or Dinamo București, among others. He is currently the manager of Metaloglobus București.

International career
Nicolae Grigore played four games at international level for Romania, making his debut on 14 October 2009 under coach Răzvan Lucescu in a 3–1 victory against Faroe Islands at the 2010 World Cup qualifiers. His following three games were friendlies which also ended up with victories, a 3–1 against Greece, a 1–0 against Switzerland and a 4–0 against Trinidad and Tobago.

International stats

Honours
Rapid București
 Divizia A: 2002–03
 Cupa României: 2001–02, 2005–06, 2006–07
 Supercupa României: 2002, 2003, 2007

References

External links

1983 births
Living people
People from Buftea
Romanian footballers
Romania international footballers
Association football midfielders
Liga I players
FC Rapid București players
FC Brașov (1936) players
FC Dinamo București players
FC Voluntari players
Saudi Professional League players
Ettifaq FC players
Cypriot First Division players
Apollon Limassol FC players
Romanian expatriate footballers
Romanian expatriate sportspeople in Saudi Arabia
Expatriate footballers in Saudi Arabia
Romanian expatriate sportspeople in Cyprus
Expatriate footballers in Cyprus
Romanian football managers
FC Rapid București managers
FC Metaloglobus București managers
FC Rapid București assistant managers